The House at 729 Dedham Street is a historic house located at 729 Dedham Street in Newton, Massachusetts.

Description and history 
The -story wood-frame house was built c. 1855, and is a rare local example of a Greek Revival cottage. It is five bays wide, with its roof line oriented side to side. Below the roof is a wide entablature, supported by corner pilasters. The front entry is flanked by half-length sidelight windows, with sash windows in the other four bays. It was built for Calvin Rand, about whom nothing is known, and was later occupied by a local schoolteacher.

The house was listed on the National Register of Historic Places on September 4, 1986.

See also
 National Register of Historic Places listings in Newton, Massachusetts

References

Houses on the National Register of Historic Places in Newton, Massachusetts
Houses completed in 1855
Greek Revival architecture in Massachusetts